The BSA Bantam is a two-stroke unit construction motorcycle that was produced by the Birmingham Small Arms Company (BSA) from 1948 (as a 125 cc) until 1971 (as a 175 cc). Exact production figures are unknown, but it was over 250,000 and some estimates place the number closer to half a million.

History
Despite the Bantam being considered the archetypal 'truly British' lightweight motorcycle outselling all others, it was based on a German design. The Bantam was based on the DKW RT 125, a design that was received as war reparations, with the Bantam as a mirror image so the gearchange was on the right side as with other British motorcycles of the period. The same design went into production in at least two, and perhaps four, other countries. Harley-Davidson started producing their Model 125 in late 1947 (several months before BSA) and the occupiers of East Germany, the U.S.S.R. began building the Москва (Moskva) M1A model even earlier, c.1946. In East Germany the machine was made at the original DKW factory by IFA, which later became MZ and Japan also produced copies.

The BSA designers made the design a mirror image with right hand side controls and Imperial fittings for manufacture in Birmingham. This original Bantam, the D1, was released in 1948 outside of the UK and was release in the UK in 1949, and  continued in production for several years. It had telescopic forks, a rigid rear end, direct electrics, shovel front-mudguard and fishtail silencer, was available only in "mist green" and sold for £60 plus tax. Although the frame changed out of recognition (beginning with conversion to plunger and then swinging fork rear suspension), the engine remained a recognizable development of the original for the entire 23 years of production.

Engine
The engine is a unit construction (engine and gearbox of one piece) single cylinder 2 stroke. The barrel is cast iron while the head is alloy. The gearbox was initially three speeds, later versions went to four, fed through a "wet" clutch. Ignition was of two types: a Lucas battery-powered coil in earlier machines, or a magneto by Wipac. The magneto was on a composite assembly sitting within the flywheel with its magnet inserts; windings gave power either directly to the lights (with a dry cell for when the engine was stopped) or through a rectifier into a lead acid battery. The early D1s had "fish tail" styled exhausts but this was replaced with the more conventional cylindrical silencer. High-level exhausts were made for the trials and off-road models, in which the only electrics are the magneto-powered ignition.

Models

This listing shows only the main variants and most models were available with refinements or in competition form. BSA had used a lettering system for their range of motorcycles and started the "D" series for their first two-stroke. The D175 was marketed as the B175 as BSA struggled against imports in the late 60s to its closure in 1972 (the larger capacity "B" series having helped make them the largest motorcycle manufacturer in the world). The engine size shown is nominal, British motorcycles were made 1 or 3 cc smaller than their tax bracket maximum to allow for re-bores and wear.

Pre-1958 (D1 to D3) had 19 inch wheels and 4.5 inch brakes. The 1958 D5 had 18 inch wheels and 4.5 inch brakes. 1959 D7 and later models had 18 inch wheels and 5 inch brakes front and rear.

Developments and models

D1
The D1 (the original model) 125cc was available initially only with a rigid rear suspension, although within three years the range was enhanced to include an optional plunger rear suspension. The front suspension of all D1's possessed no damping and resulted in a bouncy ride quality.
D1's were available with a variety of electrical lighting systems. Wipac systems were available either in 6v AC (known as direct lighting) or DC. The AC system used a small dry 'torch' cell battery to illuminate the forward facing 'pilot' bulb within the headlamp shell, the remaining lighting was only available for use when the engine was running and the dry cell had to be regularly replaced. The DC system incorporated a lead acid battery and operated in a conventional manner. For a short period some D1's were equipped with Lucas lighting systems and these operated in a similar manner to the Wipac DC system. The D1 continued to be available to the public right up until 1963 and was still produced for the GPO (General Post Office) for at least 2 more years.

DELUXE/BD1: This model has specification identical to the standard D1 model, but has a black tank with chromium strip on top and cream side panels: black frame and mudguards: chromium plated rims: polished primary chain cover and is equipped with crash bars, legshiels and larger carrier.  The model was available by special order from 1949-1953 in the overseas market, primarily in Canada, US, Australia but not in the UK. There was no production records for this model  or where they were sent.

D3 Major
The D3 Major represented the first step in development of the Bantam, although the D1 would be produced for many years to come. First produced in late (most likely October was the first released) 1953 with a 150cc engine, the D3 continued in production until 1957. A modern-style foam-filled pillion seat was fitted as standard, an economy and comfort breakthrough that had become popular as an option on the D1. It replaced the original standard fitting of a parcel carrier behind an individual sprung rubber seat.

In addition, the front suspension was made more substantial in volume and the cylinder was not simply bored out but was enlarged with distinctive larger thermal cooling fins. These larger cooling fins was also added to the post-1953 D1 models, albeit they maintained their smaller bore.

D5 Super
The D5 Super was a further development of the Swinging Arm D3 with a similar frame but with lengthened rear section which gave more upright mounts for the rear suspension. A more rounded style of tank was fitted. The engine was further increased to 175cc. The D5 model was only produced for the 1958 season.

D7 Super
The D7 Super was introduced for 1959, had a similar 175cc engine to the D5 but had an entirely new swinging arm frame and hydraulically damped forks which incorporated a nacelle mounted headlamp. The D7 continued in production until 1966 with at least 3 different styles of tank and alterations to the Wipac powered electrical system including a change to battery powered external coil ignition.

D10 Supreme
1966 saw the introduction of the D10, still 175cc and 3 speed gearbox but with increased power. The electrical system was further revised with a new type of Wipac alternator and rotor. The points were moved from the nearside to a separate housing in the primary drive cover on the offside, apart from this the bike's external appearance was very similar to the late D7 models. There were 2 variants added to the range both with 4 speed gearboxes, high level exhaust and forks with no nacelle but a separate headlamp.  The first was the Sports model with Chrome mudguards, a fly-screen and a hump on the rear of the dual-seat. The second was the Bushman, mostly for export, which had 19 inch wheels and a modified frame for more ground clearance. D10 production ceased in 1967.

D14/4 Supreme
For the 1968 model year the D14/4 was introduced, similar to the D10 but with greater power again and the 4 speed gearbox fitted across the range. The Sports and Bushman models also gained heavier front forks.

B175
The B175 (and B175 Bushman) was the ultimate Bantam model produced and arguably the best in terms of power delivery and handling. It was a subtle and refined reworking of the D14 model. The engine featured a handsome new cylinder head design with revised finning and a central vertical spark plug, the efficient squish combustion chamber had a slightly lower compression ratio at 9.5:1 which combined to give a smoother running engine without any power loss over the previous D14 models. The forks are slightly heavier in construction than those previously fitted and have external springs. It had a separate headlight with high-beam warning, exposed rear shock springs, strengthened kickstart shaft all with folding pedals, revised fixing on crankshaft compression disc plates. This final model was produced from 1969 to 1971 in handsome metallic red & blue or plain black liveries, all with white painted linings on the fuel tank, mudguards and side panels like the D14 and featured a modern outline text decal in yellow reading “Bantam 175” on the side panels, the right hand side panel covered and efficient large air filter that fed the AMAL 626 Concentric carburettor via a rubber hose. Even after the demise of BSA the remaining stocks of B175s were still being sold at least until 1973 to lucky and discerning buyers!

Bushman

The off-road Bushman version was available as an export model, for Africa and Australia in particular, but 300 were sold in the UK. 
All UK Bushman models carry the engine number prefix BB. The precursor to the Bushman was a stripped down D7 called a Bronc Buck but the Bushman models proper were fully equipped with lights, high level exhaust systems, side strands and sported dual seats apart from the commercial farming focused Pastoral model with its single saddle and carrier rack. The very first Bushmans were derived from the D7 but produced in far greater numbers as D10 models, some D14 and ultimately the B175 Bushman from 1969 - 71. There are various air filters fitted to the Bushman models but all were mounted remotely from the carburettor behind the side panels where the battery was on road Bantams, the Bushman models had direct lighting so dispensed with the battery. Most featured sump guard plates and the engine mounts are raised slightly to give the engine cases better clearance from rocks etc. Even by the mid 1970s the Bushman models were sought after by collectors and they are even more so today an amazing 49 years after BSA produced the last ones in 1971.

D18
BSA engineers were working on an upgrade to the Bantam, the D18, before financial troubles in 1971 resulted in a drastic reduction of the model range. The D18 was intended to be an interim model before the introduction of a new range of two-strokes that were in development. The D18 used an alloy barrel and a new head with a central spark plugs. A prototype was built before the project was cancelled.

See also
List of BSA motorcycles
List of motorcycles of the 1940s
List of motorcycles of the 1950s

References

External links

BSA Bantam Club
BSA Bantam D7 Restoration Page
Mistgreen Bantam Website (Australian)
Reference Library 

Bantam
Two-stroke motorcycles
Motorcycles introduced in 1948
Single-cylinder motorcycles